Stenden University Qatar is a former campus of Stenden University of Applied Sciences, which is based in the Netherlands. The Qatar campus is presently located at Al-Jeleait Street, Bin Omran, Doha in the state of Qatar. Stenden University Qatar was a joint venture between Al Rayyan Education and Stenden University of Applied Sciences.

In 2021, the university changed its name to Al Rayyan International University College (ARIU), ended its association with Stenden, and entered into an academic partnership with the University of Derby, UK.

History 
The joint venture between Stenden University of Applied Sciences and Al Rayyan Education was established in 2000 and terminated in 2020.

References

External links 
 Stenden University Qatar Official Website

NHL Stenden University of Applied Sciences
Education in Qatar